Arcore is a comune (municipality) in the Province of Monza and Brianza in the Italian region Lombardy, located about  northeast of Milan.

Arcore borders the following municipalities: Usmate Velate, Camparada, Lesmo, Biassono, Vimercate, Villasanta, Concorezzo.

History 

The origin of the city is not clear: by the etymology of the name, it's probably datable during the Roman Empire. To endorse this hypothesis there are different elements: the presence of centuriations and the discovery, in the Middle Ages, of a Roman marble slab, now kept in the Archaeological Museum of Milan.

The oldest documents so far discovered dates back to the 10th century. Arcore, in the Middle Ages, is under the control of the Pieve of Vimercate, and is historically documented the presence of two monasteries, la Casa delle Umiliate in Sant'Apollinare and the Benedictine monastery of Saint Martin of Tours.

By the 16th century, several noble lombard families (Casati, Durini, Giulini, Vismara, D'Adda, Barbò) begin to build many important villas usually surrounded by park, the ville di delizia, including the Villa Borromeo-d'Adda, the Villa la Cazzola and the Villa San Martino (the current residence of Silvio Berlusconi).

After the Italian unification (1861), through the construction of the 2 Arcore's railway stations (the first in front at Villa Borromeo-D'Adda, and the second - of a different railway line - located in Ca' Bianca-Buttafava) and the establishment of numerous industries (like Gilera), the city has gradually expanded up to become, today, one of the most active and largest cities in Brianza.

Twin towns
Arcore is twinned with:
  Corinaldo, Italy
  Bruges, Belgium

References

External links

 Official website 

Cities and towns in Lombardy
Populated places on Brianza